Messaggero Veneto – Giornale del Friuli is an Italian local daily newspaper, based in Udine, Italy. It has the largest readership in Friuli-Venezia Giulia. The Monday edition is called Messaggero del Lunedì.

History and profile
It was founded in 1946 when Friuli was still part of Veneto and Venezia Giulia was claimed by the Socialist Federal Republic of Yugoslavia. It was acquired by Gruppo Editoriale L'Espresso in 1998. The paper has its headquarters in Udine.

Messaggero Veneto had a circulation of 51,393 copies in 2008. The Espresso Group reported that the circulation of the paper was 44,300 copies in 2014.

References

External links
 Official Website 
 

1946 establishments in Italy
Italian-language newspapers
GEDI Gruppo Editoriale
Mass media in Udine
Newspapers established in 1946
Daily newspapers published in Italy